Zhuzhou High-Tech Industrial Development Zone (abbr: ZZHTZ) is a national high-tech industrial zone in Yiyang, Hunan, China. Its main industries are rail transit, general aviation and new energy vehicles.

History
Zhuzhou High-Tech Industrial Development Zone was first established in May 1992. In November of the same year, it became a national HTZs approved by the State Council of China.

References

Economy of Zhuzhou
1992 establishments in China
Special Economic Zones of China